Do You Know may refer to:

Music

Albums
 Do You Know (Michelle Williams album) an album from Michelle Williams
 "Do You Know", the album's title track
 Do You Know (Jessica Simpson album), an album from Jessica Simpson
 "Do You Know", the album's title track, featuring Dolly Parton

Songs
 "Do You Know" (Michelle Gayle song), a 1997 song by Michelle Gayle
 "Do You Know? (The Ping Pong Song)", an Enrique Iglesias song
 "Do You Know (What It Takes)", a Robyn song
 "Do You Know", a song by The Cranberries from Wake Up and Smell the Coffee
 "Do You Know", a song by Fleetwood Mac from Behind the Mask
 "Do You Know?", a song by Puff Daddy from No Way Out
 "Do You Know", a song by Quietdrive from Leaving Dramatics EP
 "Do You Know", a song by Sick Puppies from Welcome to the Real World
 "Do You Know", a song by The Slackers from The Question
 "Do You Know", a song by Soul Asylum from Say What You Will, Clarence... Karl Sold the Truck
 "Do You Know", a song by TobyMac from Momentum
 "Do You Know", a song by Tonic from Head on Straight
 "Do You Know", a song by Total from Total
 "Do You Know", a song by Uriah Heep from Firefly
 "Do You Know", a song by Xscape from Traces of My Lipstick
 "Do You Know (Knife in Your Back)", a song from Killradio
 "넌 알고 있니" (Korean for "Do You Know?"), a song from Park Jung-min
 "Theme from Mahogany", also known as "Do You Know Where You're Going To" or just "Do You Know"

Television
 Do You Know? (TV series), a British children's TV show presented by Maddie Moate

See also
 Did You Know (disambiguation)
 Do U Know, an album from Janice Vidal
 Do You Know Squarepusher, an album from Squarepusher
 DYK (disambiguation)